Primula japonica, the Japanese primrose, Japanese cowslip, Queen of primroses, or valley red, is a species of flowering plant in the family Primulaceae, native to Japan. The common name Japanese primrose also applies to the related species Primula sieboldii.

The plant prefers shady, damp, poorly drained conditions such as those found at the edge of streams and ponds. Numerous cultivars have been developed for garden use, of which 'Miller's Crimson' and 'Postford white' 
 have won the Royal Horticultural Society's Award of Garden Merit.

Description

The first photograph of this plant was printed in 1871 in the Gardeners' Chronicle.

References

Flora of Japan
japonica
Taxa named by Asa Gray